Mandovani Marine (12.5-Meter) class of patrol crafts are a series of five watercraft built by Mandovi Marine Pvt LTD, Indore for Indian Coast Guard during the 1980s
.

Description
The crafts have a modified deep 'vee' hull, which is made of Glass-reinforced plastic and is fitted out with accommodation forward and the wheelhouse amidships. These boats are powered by twin Cummins diesel engines, which are linked to Hamilton water-jet units and a platform aft of the transom offers protection to these drive units. This gives a speed of 18 knots at the normal displacement of 10 tonnes. The fuel carrying capacity of the crafts is 800 liters.
A high-speed version, Mandovi Marine (15 meter) class patrol craft are in service of Mauritius and Islamic Republic of Mauritania.

Specification
Displacement : 10 tonnes
Length : 12.5 meter
Breath : 3.5 meter
Draught : 0.8 meter
Power : 2 Cummins diesels, 275 hp each
Propulsion : 2 Hamilton waterjets, 550 bh
Fuel : 800 Litres

See also
 Swallow Craft Class
 AMPL Class
 Griffon/Grse Class
 Timblo Class
 Bristol Class

References

External links
Indian Coast Guard official website

Fast attack craft of the Indian Coast Guard
Patrol boat classes